Holy Water is the fifth solo album released by South African singer Wendy Oldfield. It was released in 2002. The album was rated as number 17 in the South African Rock Digest "Top 30 albums of 2002".

Track listing 
Life
Rain Won't Come
Holy Water
Touch Your Skin
Heaven
Sun
Knocking At The Door
How Come
(I Got) A Little Way To Go
Sun (Poplanet mix)
Holy Water (Temple mix)

References 

2002 albums
Wendy Oldfield albums